The Trojans Club based at Stoneham Lane,  Eastleigh, Hampshire was formed in 1874, initially as a rugby union club.  The men's rugby 1st XV currently play in London 3 South West - a league at the eighth level of the English rugby union system, while the men's 2nd XV will play in the Hampshire Leagues.

There are now four very active sections, rugby, cricket, hockey, and squash, covering all ages from Under 8 to Seniors and both men and women, boys and girls. During its long and proud history, the Trojans Club has done much to foster amateur sport and has, over the years, produced many county and international players including Anthony Allen.

Club Honours
Hampshire 2 champions: 1992–93
Hampshire 1 v Surrey 1 promotion playoff winners: 2000-01
Hampshire 1 champions (2): 2004-05, 2006-07
Hampshire Bowl winners: 2009, 2017
London 2 (south-east v south-west) promotion playoff winners: 2010-11

External links
Trojans web-site.

English rugby union teams
Sports clubs in Hampshire
Eastleigh
Rugby union clubs in Hampshire